Eritrea competed at the 2018 Winter Olympics in Pyeongchang, South Korea, from 9 to 25 February 2018. The country made its debut at the Winter Olympics. Eritrea's team consisted of one alpine skier, Shannon-Ogbnai Abeda, who carried the country's flag during the opening ceremony.

Competitors
The following is the list of number of competitors participating in the Eritrean delegation per sport.

Alpine skiing 

Eritrea qualified one male athlete, Canadian born skier Shannon-Ogbnai Abeda. Abeda also represented the country at the inaugural Winter Youth Olympics in 2012 in Innsbruck, Austria.

See also

Eritrea at the 2012 Winter Youth Olympics

References

Nations at the 2018 Winter Olympics
2018
2018 in Eritrean sport